Cuberant Lake (or Cuberant Lake #1) is a lake in the Uinta Mountains in Summit County, Utah, United States.

Cuberant is a word derived from the Ute language meaning "long". The (main) lake is substantially larger than the other six lakes in the Cuberant Lakes Basin (the other six are unnamed and are simply referred to as "Cuberant Lake #2", "Cuberrant Lake #3", etc.) As the basin is surrounded by steep inclines and declines, the only reasonable access to the lake and the basin is by way of a trail (#080) the branches off the Lofty Lake Trail and circles around the west side of Mount Marsell. (The Lofty Lake Trail [#158] begins at the Mirror Lake Scenic Byway [SR-150] and heads northwest through Reid's Meadow before the two trails split.)

References

Lakes of Utah
Lakes of Summit County, Utah